Erika Natalie Louise Harold (born February 20, 1980) is an American attorney, politician, and former Miss America.

Harold was Miss Illinois 2002 and Miss America 2003.  Her pageant platform was combating bullying.  In 2014, she was a candidate in the Republican primary for the 13th Congressional District seat in the State of Illinois, ultimately losing the nomination to the incumbent, Rodney Davis.  In the 2018 election, she was the Republican nominee for Illinois Attorney General.

Background and legal career

Harold was born in Urbana, Illinois. Her ethnicity includes Greek, German and English on her father's side; and on her mother's side, both Native American and African-American.

She graduated from the University of Illinois, Phi Beta Kappa with a B.A. in political science and was a Chancellor's Scholar. In 2007, she received her J.D. from Harvard Law School, where she won best brief in the Harvard Ames Moot Court semi-final and final rounds of competition.  She has worked in Chicago, Illinois, as an associate attorney at Sidley Austin LLP and at Burke, Warren, MacKay & Serritella.  She later was a commercial litigation attorney for Meyer Capel law firm in Champaign, Illinois. In 2022, she was appointed by the Illinois Supreme Court as executive director of the Commission on Professionalism.

Pageants
She became  Miss America 2003 on September 21, 2002 (as Miss Illinois 2002). Her official platform was "Preventing Youth Violence and Bullying: Protect Yourself, Respect Yourself."  Her platform choice grew out of personal experience; she recounted having been the subject of racial and sexual harassment while growing up.  In a May 2, 2003, speech, Harold said when she turned to teachers and school administrators, her concerns were dismissed. As part of her platform, she became a national spokesperson for Fight Crime: Invest in Kids, a national advocacy group.

In the first week of her reign, she also adopted a secondary platform for sexual abstinence. The Washington Times suggested that pageant officials demonstrated a liberal bias when they allowed Miss America 1998 Kate Shindle, whose platform was HIV prevention, to advocate condom distribution and needle exchange during her time as Miss America.  On October 8, 2002, Harold gave a speech at the National Press Club in Washington during which she stated that she would talk about sexual abstinence and that she "will not be bullied" into dropping the topic from her platform.  Thirty-eight members of Congress sent her a letter of support, encouraging her to press on with her "healthy message of abstinence until marriage." During her time as Miss America, Harold interacted with legislators and testified before Congress on bullying and abstinence, which provided her with additional motivation to pursue a political career.

Politics

Harold is a Republican, and was the Youth Director for the Republican primary campaign of Illinois gubernatorial candidate Patrick O'Malley. She later served as a delegate to the 2004 Republican National Convention. She gave a speech to the convention on August 31, 2004, to support George W. Bush's faith-based initiatives.  She worked on the Bush campaign to reach out to minority voters.

In May 2012, Harold was one of four finalists for the Republican nomination for Congress in Illinois's 13th district, a nomination selected by the Republican chairmen of the 14 counties covered by the 13th Congressional District, instead of a primary election. The Republican chairmen selected Rodney L. Davis, over Harold, and Davis was subsequently elected to Congress, in an expensive race.

2014 congressional campaign

On June 4, 2013, Harold announced she would run against Rep. Rodney L. Davis, R-Ill. in the 2014 Republican primary for Illinois's 13th congressional district. Davis, Harold's opponent in the primary, was among the top targets for Democrats in 2014. On March 18, 2014, Harold lost the Republican primary to Davis 54%–41%.

2018 campaign for Illinois attorney general

On August 15, 2017, Harold announced that she would seek the Republican nomination to be Illinois attorney general. On March 20, 2018, she won the Republican nomination for attorney general garnering 59% of the vote in a two-way contest against Gary Grasso, a former mayor of Burr Ridge, IL, now a member of the DuPage County Board and a litigation attorney. She lost the general election to Democrat Kwame Raoul garnering 43% of the vote to his 55%.

Electoral history

References

External links
 
 Erika Harold biography
 

|-

|-

1980 births
African-American Christians
African-American people in Illinois politics
American people of German descent
American people of Greek descent
American people of Russian descent
American people of Welsh descent
American women lawyers
American lawyers
Harvard Law School alumni
Illinois Republicans
Living people
Miss America 2003 delegates
Miss America winners
People from Urbana, Illinois
University of Illinois Urbana-Champaign alumni
Women in Illinois politics
African-American beauty pageant winners
Black conservatism in the United States
Beauty queen-politicians
21st-century African-American women
21st-century African-American people
20th-century African-American people
20th-century African-American women